Handful of Keys is a song written and performed by Swedish pianist and composer Robert Wells. It was released in Sweden and entered the Swedish Singles Chart straight in at #1 on 17 July 2009, where it stayed for 1 week.

Charts

Weekly charts

Year-end charts

References

2009 singles
Number-one singles in Sweden
2009 songs